Nasser Muhammad, and other variants using the Arabic definite article "Al-" such as Nasser Al-Muhammad, may refer to:

 Al-Nasir Muhammad (1285–1341), Bahri Mamluk Sultan of Egypt
 An-Nasir Muhammad ibn Qaitbay (1482–1498), Mamluk Sultan of Egypt
 Nasser Mohammadkhani (born 1957), Iranian footballer
 Nasser Al-Mohammed Al-Sabah (born 1940), 6th Prime Minister of the State of Kuwait
 An-Nasir ad-Din Muhammad (1411–1422), Mamluk Sultan of Egypt
 Ali Nasir Muhammad (born 1939), leader of South Yemen (1980–1986)
 Al-Mansur Nasir al-Din Muhammad (r. 1198–1200), Ayyubid Sultan of Egypt

See also
 Muhammad Nasser (disambiguation)
 Nasser (name)
 Muhammad (name)